Swisher Field is an American football field located in Aberdeen, South Dakota on the campus of Aberdeen Central High School. It is primarily used by Northern State University, Aberdeen Central High School, Presentation College and Roncalli High School.

The Clark Swisher Athletic Complex, which contains Swisher Field, seats about 6,000 people. It also includes an eight-lane all-weather outdoor track that surrounds the field.

Renovations
In 2012, the NSU Kids Zone was made and includes inflatables plus other activities. It is sponsored by RDO Equipment and ran by the HPER department in the NSU School of Education.

In 2018, the turf was replaced and a new video board and scoreboard were added.

Clark Swisher
Clark Swisher was a football and basketball coach at Northern State University. His record at Northern State was 146–42–4 in football and 95–88 in basketball. He won 15 South Dakota Intercollegiate Conference (SDIC) championships. Swisher Field was dedicated to him on September 10, 1976.

References

College football venues
High school football venues in the United States
Northern State Wolves football
American football venues in South Dakota